"Don't Let's Start" is the 6th episode of the eleventh season of the American television medical drama Grey's Anatomy, and is the 226th episode overall. It aired on October 30, 2014 on ABC in the United States. The episode was written by Austin Guzman and directed by Rob Greenlea. On its initial airing, it was watched by 8.08 million viewers. The episode received positive reviews from critics. The episode's title is a reference to the song with the same name by They Might Be Giants.

Plot

Reception

Broadcast
The episode aired on October 30, 2014 on American Broadcasting Company (ABC) in the United States. On its initial release the episode was watched by 8.08 million viewers and garnered a 2.4/7 Nielsen ratings and ranked no. 13 in 18-49 key demographic and was the 5th most watched drama.

Reviews

The episode was well received by the television critics. Spoilertv wrote, "Season 11 so far has been strong – stronger, even, than season 10 and certainly season 9." The TV Addict also praised the episode, Oh, how I’ve missed you GREY’S, how I’ve missed you.   After a week of absence this week’s episode was a biggie."

Entertainment Weekly gave a positive review stating, "This week, there were many elements being juggled, which made for a fine hour, though it wasn’t anything particularly special for the show that has proven before that it knows how to handle its ensemble. By separating everyone out somewhat distinctly, the episode didn’t flow as well as it could have. But like I said, it was perfectly fine." and added, "the episode had its moments: The Jackson-April story played well, and I can’t tell you how happy I am that Meredith and Derek are finally smiling at each other/”showering” together. Also, Jo and Alex are great. If only everything ran together a bit more smoothly, I'd have no complaints."

References

Grey's Anatomy (season 11) episodes
2014 American television episodes